Wayne Gray may refer to:

 Wayne Gray (footballer) (born 1980), English professional footballer
 Wayne D. Gray, cognitive science professor